William Heath Robinson (31 May 1872 – 13 September 1944) was an English cartoonist, illustrator and artist, best known for drawings of whimsically elaborate machines to achieve simple objectives.

In the UK, the term "Heath Robinson contraption" gained dictionary recognition around 1912. It became part of popular language during the 1914–1918 First World War as a description of any unnecessarily complex and implausible contrivance. Other cartoonists drew on similar themes; by 1928 the American Rube Goldberg was known for "Rube Goldberg machines" in the United States. A "Heath Robinson contraption" is perhaps most commonly used in relation to temporary fixes using ingenuity and whatever is to hand, often string and tape, or unlikely cannibalisations. Its continuing popularity was undoubtedly linked to Britain's shortages and the need to "make do and mend" during the Second World War.

Early life

William Heath Robinson was born in Hornsey Rise, London, on 31 May 1872 into a family of artists in Stroud Green, Finsbury Park, North London. His grandfather Thomas, his father Thomas Robinson (1838–1902) and brothers Thomas Heath Robinson (1869–1954) and Charles Robinson (1870–1937) all worked as illustrators. His Uncle Charles was an illustrator for The Illustrated London News.

Career 
His early career involved illustrating books – among others: Hans Christian Andersen's Danish Fairy Tales and Legends (1897), The Arabian Nights (1899), Tales from Shakespeare (1902), Gargantua and Pantagruel (1904), Twelfth Night (1908), Andersen's Fairy Tales (1913), A Midsummer Night's Dream (1914), Charles Kingsley's The Water-Babies (1915) and Walter de la Mare's Peacock Pie (1916). Robinson was one of the leading illustrators selected by Percy Bradshaw for inclusion in his The Art of the Illustrator (1917-1918) which presented a separate portfolio for each of twenty illustrators.

Robinson also served as a consultant at the Percy Bradshaw's The Press Art School, a school teaching painting, drawing, and illustration by correspondence. The consultants commented on the work submitted by the students. In the course of his work, Robinson also wrote and illustrated three children's books, The Adventures of Uncle Lubin (1902), Bill the Minder (1912) and Peter Quip in Search of a Friend (1922). Uncle Lubin is regarded as the start of his career in the depiction of unlikely machines.

During the First World War, he drew large numbers of cartoons, depicting ever-more-unlikely secret weapons being used by the combatants.  He also depicted the American Expeditionary Force in France. His work was also part of the painting event in the art competition at the 1932 Summer Olympics.

He also produced a steady stream of humorous drawings for magazines and advertisements. In 1934 he published a collection of his favourites as Absurdities, such as:

"The Wart Chair. A simple apparatus for removing a wart from the top of the head"
"Resuscitating stale railway scones for redistribution at the station buffets"
"The multimovement tabby silencer", which automatically threw water at serenading cats

Most of his cartoons have since been reprinted many times in multiple collections.

In 1935 the Great Western Railway commissioned him to create a set of cartoons on the theme of the GWR itself, which they then published as Railway Ribaldry. The Foreword (by 'G.W.R') notes that the cartoonist was given a free hand to re-imagine the history of the line for the amusement of its customers. The result is a 96-page softback book with alternating full-page cartoons and smaller vignettes, all on pertinent subjects.

The machines he drew were frequently powered by steam boilers or kettles, heated by candles or a spirit lamp and usually kept running by balding, bespectacled men in overalls. There would be complex pulley arrangements, threaded by lengths of knotted string. Robinson's cartoons were so popular that in Britain the term "Heath Robinson" is used to refer to an improbable, rickety machine barely kept going by incessant tinkering. (The corresponding term in the U.S. is Rube Goldberg, after the American cartoonist born just over a decade later, with an equal devotion to odd machinery. Similar "inventions" have been drawn by cartoonists in many countries, with the Danish Storm Petersen being on par with Robinson and Goldberg.)

One of his most famous series of illustrations was that which accompanied the first Professor Branestawm book written by Norman Hunter. The stories told of the eponymous professor who was brilliant, eccentric and forgetful and provided a perfect backdrop for Robinson's drawings.

In around 1928 Robinson was commissioned to design a range of nursery ware for W.R. Midwinter, a Staffordshire pottery firm. Scenes from sixteen nursery rhymes (some illustrated with more than one vignette) were printed on ware ranging from eggcups to biscuit barrels, each with a decorative border of characterful children's faces.  Titled "Fairyland on China", the range was favourably reviewed in the trade press.

The last project Robinson worked on shortly before he died was illustrations for Lilian M. Clopet's short story collection Once Upon a Time, which was published in 1944.

One of the automatic analysis machines built for Bletchley Park during the Second World War to assist in the decryption of German message traffic was named "Heath Robinson" in his honour. It was a direct predecessor to the Colossus, the world's first programmable digital electronic computer.

Personal life 
In 1903 he married Josephine Latey, the daughter of newspaper editor John Latey. Heath Robinson moved to Pinner, Middlesex, in 1908. They had two children, Joan and Oliver. His house in Moss Lane is commemorated by a blue plaque.

In 1918 the Heath Robinsons moved to Cranleigh, Surrey where their daughter attended St Catherine's School, Bramley and their son attended Cranleigh School. Heath Robinson drew designs and illustrations for local institutions and schools. Heath Robinson was too old to enlist for WW1, but took on two German POWs to garden, post the Armistice. In 1929 the Heath Robinsons returned to London where his two children were now working.

Death and legacy 
He died in September 1944, during the Second World War, and is buried in East Finchley Cemetery.

The Heath Robinson Museum opened in October 2016 to house a collection of nearly 1,000 original artworks owned by The William Heath Robinson Trust. The museum is in Memorial Park, Pinner, close to where the artist lived and worked.

In popular culture

The name "Heath Robinson" became part of common parlance in the UK for complex inventions that achieved absurdly simple results following its use as services slang during the 1914–1918 First World War.

In the Wallace and Gromit films, Wallace often invents Heath Robinson-like machines, with some inventions being direct references.

During the Falklands War (1982), British Harrier aircraft lacked their conventional "chaff"-dispensing mechanism.
Therefore, Royal Navy engineers designed an impromptu delivery system of welding rods, split pins and string which allowed six packets of chaff to be stored in the speedbrake well and deployed in flight. Due to its improvised and ramshackle nature it was often referred to as the "Heath Robinson chaff modification".

Publications
Patterson, R.F., illustrated by W. Heath Robinson, Mein Rant: A Summary in Light Verse of Mein Kampf. 1940
Robinson, W. Heath, Works of Edgar Allan Poe, Bell. 1900
Robinson, W. Heath, Uncle Lubin, Richards. 1902
Robinson, W. Heath, Adventures of Don Quixote, J.M. Dent. 1902
Robinson, W. Heath, Bill the Minder, Constable & Co., London, 1912
Robinson, W. Heath, Some "Frightful" War Pictures, Duckworth. 1915
Robinson, W. Heath, Hunlikely!, Duckworth. 1916
Robinson, W. Heath, The Saintly Hun: a book of German virtues, Duckworth. 1917
Robinson, W. Heath, Flypapers, Duckworth. 1919
Robinson, W. Heath, The Rabelais, Rabelais. [Private Printing] 1921
Robinson, W. Heath, Peter Quip in Search of a Friend, Partridge 1921
Robinson, W. Heath, Humours of Golf, Methuen. 1923, [Duckworth. 1973, ]
Robinson, W. Heath, Heath Robinson's Book of Goblins, Hutchinson & Co, London, 1934
Robinson, W. Heath, Absurdities: A Book of Collected Drawings, Hutchinson. 1934, [Duckworth. 1975, ]
Robinson, W. Heath, Railway Ribaldry, Great Western Railway, 1935
Robinson, W. Heath, Railway Ribaldry, Duckworth. 1935, [Duckworth. 1997, ]
Robinson, W. Heath, How to Live in Flat, Hutchinson. 1936, [Duckworth. 1976]
 Robinson, W. Heath, How to be a Perfect Husband, Hutchinson & Co, London, 1937
 Robinson, W. Heath, How to Make a Garden Grow, Hutchinson & Co, London, 1938
Robinson, W. Heath, How to be a Motorist, Hutchinson & Co, London 1939
Robinson, W. Heath, My Line of Life, Blackie & Sons. 1938
Robinson, W. Heath, Let's Laugh: A Book of Humorous Inventions, Hutchinson. 1939
Robinson, W. Heath, Heath Robinson at War, Methuen. 1942
Clopet, Lilian M., illustrated by W. Heath Robinson, Once Upon a Time. 1944
Lewis, John. Heath Robinson Artist and Comic Genius, Barnes and Noble. 1973
Robinson, W. Heath, Inventions, Duckworth. 1973, 
De Freitas, Leo John, The Fantastic Paintings of Charles and William Heath Robinson, Peacock/Bantam. 1976
Robinson, W. Heath, Devices, Duckworth. 1977, 
Beare, Geoffrey. The Illustrations of W. Heath Robinson, Werner Shaw. 1983
Beare, Geoffrey. W. Heath Robinson, Chris Beetles. 1987
Hamilton, James, William °Heath Robinson, Pavilion. 1992
Beare, Geoffrey, The Brothers Robinson, Chris Beetles. 1992
Beare, Geoffrey, The Art of William Heath Robinson, Dulwich Picture Gallery. 2003
Robinson, W. Heath, Contraptions, Duckworth. 2007
Robinson, W. Heath, Britain at Play, Duckworth. 2008
Beare, Geoffrey, Heath Robinson's Commercial Art, Lund Humphries, 2017
Hart-Davis, Adam, Very Heath Robinson, Sheldrake Press. 2017

See also 

 Norman Hunter (author)
 Professor Branestawm
 Rube Goldberg, American artist with similar cartoon inventions
 Storm P., Danish artist with similar cartoon inventions
 Rowland Emett, British cartoonist with similar physical inventions

Notes

References

Historic Figures at the BBC web site. Retrieved May 2007

External links 

 The William Heath Robinson Trust
 The Heath Robinson Museum
 Heath Robinson exhibition at the Walker Art Gallery, Liverpool, 2004
 SurLaLune Fairy Tale Pages: Fairy Tale Illustrations of William Heath Robinson
 W. H. Robinson's illustrations for Andersen's Fairy Tales (1913) and Heath Robinson's Book of Goblins (Golden Age Children's Book Illustrators Gallery)
 Tribute from JVJ Publishing site
 
 

1872 births
1944 deaths
English cartoonists
English illustrators
People from Islington (district)
People from Pinner
19th-century illustrators of fairy tales
20th-century illustrators of fairy tales
Burials at East Finchley Cemetery
The New Yorker cartoonists
Olympic competitors in art competitions
People educated at Islington Proprietary School